Karin Lundgren is the name of

 Karin Lundgren (swimmer) (1895–1977), Swedish freestyle swimmer
 Karin Lundgren (athlete) (born 1944), Swedish sprinter